Amhuinnsuidhe is a settlement on the Harris, in the Outer Hebrides, Scotland. The settlement is also within the parish of Harris. Amhuinnsuidhe is centred on the country house, Amhuinnsuidhe Castle, which is adjacent to the B887 road.

Geography
Amhuinnsuidhe lies on the northern shore of West Loch Tarbert on Harris. Sron Uladail, one of the highest sheer cliffs in the British Isles is located nearby.

History

Amhuinnsuidhe Castle was built in 1865 for Charles Murray, 7th Earl of Dunmore. The castle, as the North Harris Estate, remained in private ownership until 2003.

The  estate was transferred to community ownership in 2003, when the North Harris Trust purchasing the land in a community land purchase. The castle and fishing rights were purchased by  Ian Scarr-Hall. They are now operated as Amhuinnsuidhe Castle Estate, a sporting hotel and conference venue.

References

External links

Canmore - Harris, Amhuinnsuidhe site record
Canmore - Amhuinnsuidhe, Abhainn Mor, Bridge site record
Canmore - Harris, Amhuinnsuidhe Castle site record

Villages in Harris, Outer Hebrides